A.S. Roma returned to prominence with a 3rd place in Serie A under returning coach Nils Liedholm. With new signings such as Rudi Völler and Lionello Manfredonia, Roma was able to qualify for international football once again, with playmaker Giuseppe Giannini arguably playing at his very peak, setting a career record 11 league goals from attacking midfield.

Squad

Goalkeepers
  Franco Tancredi
  Giuseppe Garzilli
  Angelo Peruzzi

Defenders
  Francesco Grafitelli
  Maya Sumitomo
  Fulvio Collovati
  Manuel Gerolin
  Sebastiano Nela
  Alessandro Minoltà
  Emidio Oddi
  Ubaldo Righetti
  Gianluca Signorini
  Antonio Tempestilli
  David Schmidt
  Alessandro Gladstonelli

Midfielders
  Angelo Blasi
  Bruno Conti
  Sergio Domini
  Lionello Manfredonia
  Stefano Desideri
  Thomas Böhme
  Giuseppe Giannini
  Roberto Policano
  Massimiliano Cappioli
  Gianni Cavezzi
  Alessandro Belentedicci

Attackers
  Francesco Belodedicci
  Zbigniew Boniek
  Massimo Agostini
  Edoardo Artistico
  Roberto Pruzzo
  Rudi Völler
  Salvatore Empalmetti

Serie A

League table

Matches

Top scorers
  Giuseppe Giannini 11 (2)
  Zbigniew Boniek 6 (2)
  Stefano Desideri 4
  Lionello Manfredonia 3
  Rudi Völler 3

Coppa Italia 

First Round - Group 6

Eightfinals

References

Sources
  RSSSF - Italy 1987/88

A.S. Roma seasons
Roma